The discography of Booty Luv, an English dance duo who formed in June 2006 following the split of their former band Big Brovaz, originally known as Booty Luv before changing their name in 2011, consists of one studio album, and seven singles. They released their first single "Boogie 2nite", a cover of the Tweet single in November 2006 which entered the UK charts at number two. Due to the success of the single a second single was released, this time a cover of the Luther Vandross song "Shine" which was released in May 2007 and entered the UK charts at number ten and the Dance Chart at number one. The duo's debut album Boogie 2nite was released in September 2007 which went to number eleven on the UK album chart and certified Gold. Three more singles were taken from the album including "Don't Mess with My Man", "Some Kinda Rush" and final single "Dance Dance" but was not officially released in the United Kingdom.

Following a two-year break to record their second studio album the duo released "Say It" which was set to be taken as the lead single from the album but due to low single sales the album was cancelled. Following the cancellation of the second album the duo went on a two-year hiatus, they reformed under their new name in September 2011 "Cherise & Nadia" and released the promotional single "This Night". The duo released "Black Widow" the first single from their forthcoming second studio album on 3 February 2013 but failed to chart.

Albums

Studio albums

Singles

As lead artist

Promotional singles

Music videos

References

Pop music group discographies
Discographies of British artists